The Holy Family Shrine is a Roman Catholic shrine located along Interstate 80 outside of Omaha, Nebraska near the town of Gretna.

History
The idea to build a shrine for travelers on the Interstate was conceived in 1993 when four Catholics—a priest, two architects, and another layperson—were all inspired to build a chapel for travelers "of the road and of the spirit".  The land was purchased in 1995, but funding and administrative difficulties delayed the project for two years.  Construction of the parking lot and visitor center began in 1997, but further funding to begin construction of the chapel was not secured until 1999. The chapel building topped out in July 2000.  The following week, a windstorm destroyed the structure.  The chapel was opened to the public in July 2002. 

A path of life-size depictions of the stations of the cross was built in 2013.  

20,000 people visited the chapel in 2016.

Architecture
The project was designed by Jim Dennel of Omaha-based firm BCDM Architects.  The chapel stands on bluffs that overlook Interstate 80.  The chapel building, inspired by Thorncrown Chapel, is made of western red cedar beams and glass walls.  The southern window features an etching of the Holy Family, the namesake of the shrine. The primarily glass construction was chosen to allow for unobstructed views of the surrounding landscape. A visitors center inspired by a prairie dugout contains a gift shop, meeting spaces, and restrooms.  The entrance to the visitors center is meant to evoke the tomb of Jesus, and a sculpture/skylight to evoke his shroud. A  cross is located past the front of the shrine, towering over the interstate below.

Gallery

References

External Links

Roman Catholic churches in Omaha, Nebraska
Roman Catholic shrines in the United States
Roman Catholic churches completed in 2002